Donaldson is a surname.

Donaldson may also refer to:

Places in the United States
Donaldson, Arkansas, a town in Hot Spring County
Donaldson, Indiana, an unincorporated town in West Township, Marshall County
Donaldson, Kentucky
Donaldson, Minnesota, a city in Kittson County
Donaldson, Pennsylvania, a census-designated place in Schuylkill County
Donaldson, Hampshire County, West Virginia, an unincorporated community
Donaldson, Webster County, West Virginia
Donaldson Air Force Base, a closed facility of the United States Air Force
Donaldson Center Airport, a public airport south of Greenville, South Carolina
Donaldson Mountain, in Franklin County, New York
Donaldson Run, a stream in Arlington County, Virginia

Businesses
Donaldson Company, a U.S. filtration solutions company founded in 1915
Donaldson, Lufkin & Jenrette, a U.S. investment bank founded in 1959
Donaldson and Meier, an architectural firm based in Detroit, Michigan
Donaldson, Moir and Paterson, a Scottish rock group originally formed in 1985
Donaldson International Airways, a British charter airline from 1968 to 1974
Donaldson's, a defunct department store company in Minneapolis, Minnesota, USA

Other uses
Donaldson Brown (1885–1965), financial executive and corporate director with DuPont and General Motors Corporation
USS Donaldson, three ships of the United States Navy have been named Donaldson

See also
Donaldson's College, Linlithgow, Scotland
O'Connor v. Donaldson, 422 U.S. 563 (1975), a landmark decision in mental health law